1425 Tuorla, provisional designation , is a stony Eunomian asteroid from the central regions of the asteroid belt, approximately 14 kilometers in diameter. It was discovered on 3 April 1937, by Finnish astronomer Kustaa Inkeri at the Iso-Heikkilä Observatory in Turku, southwestern Finland. The asteroid was named after the Tuorla Observatory of the University of Turku. It was Kustaa Inkeri's only asteroid discovery.

Orbit and classification 

Tuorla is a member of the Eunomia family, a prominent family of stony asteroids and the largest one in the intermediate main belt with more than 5,000 members. It orbits the Sun at a distance of 2.3–2.9 AU once every 4 years and 3 months (1,542 days). Its orbit has an eccentricity of 0.10 and an inclination of 13° with respect to the ecliptic. The body's observation arc begins at Turku, the night before its official discovery observation.

Physical characteristics 

Tuorla has been characterized as a stony S-type asteroid by Pan-STARRS photometric survey, in accordance with the overall spectral type for members of the Eunomia family.

Rotation period 

In April 2013, the so-far best-rated a rotational lightcurve of Tuorla was obtained from photometric observations by astronomer Vladimir Benishek at Belgrade Observatory in Serbia. Lightcurve analysis gave a well-defined rotation period of 7.75 hours (h) with a brightness variation of 0.24 magnitude. Other lightcurves were obtained by Alfonso Carreno Garceran (6.76 h), Laurent Bernasconi (7.75 h), and the Palomar Transient Factory (7.748 h),

Diameter and albedo 

According to the surveys carried out by the Infrared Astronomical Satellite IRAS, the Japanese Akari satellite and the NEOWISE mission of NASA's Wide-field Infrared Survey Explorer, Tuorla measures between 11.795 and 14.94 kilometers in diameter and its surface has an albedo between 0.2390 and 0.383. The Collaborative Asteroid Lightcurve Link derives an albedo of 0.2389 and adopts a diameter of 14.94 kilometers from IRAS, based on an absolute magnitude of 11.3.

Naming 

This minor planet was named after the Tuorla Observatory, the Research Institute for Astronomy and Optics, of the University of Turku, located in Piikkiö near Turku, Finland. The Tuorla Observatory was established by prolific minor-planet discoverer Yrjö Väisälä in 1952, as an alternative to the Iso-Heikkilä Observatory, where this asteroid was discovered. The official  was published by the Minor Planet Center on 30 January 1964.

Notes

References

External links 
 Asteroid Lightcurve Database (LCDB), query form (info )
 Dictionary of Minor Planet Names, Google books
 Asteroids and comets rotation curves, CdR – Observatoire de Genève, Raoul Behrend
 Discovery Circumstances: Numbered Minor Planets (1)-(5000) – Minor Planet Center
 
 

001425
Named minor planets
19370403